Léon (Léo) Leopold Marie count d'Ursel (Bruxelles, 7 August 1867 - Bettignies, France – 26 June 1934) was a Belgian diplomat.

Family 
He was the youngest son of Léon, the 5th duke of Ursel and his wife Madelein d'Harcourt. In Paris he married Jeanne, countess de Francqueville and had 6 children.

Career 
On 31 January 1919, he was named as plenipotentiary minister and in special mission of the King of the Belgians to the Holy See. He was also secretary of the Minister of  Foreign Relations during Julien Davignon's tenure.

Honours 
 : Knight Grand Cross of the Order of St. Gregory the Great.
 :  
Commander of the Order of Leopold.
 Commander of the Order of the Crown.
 :  Commander of the Legion of Honour.
 :  Commander of the Military Order of Christ.
 :  
1st Class of the Order of the Crown of Prussia.
2nd Class of the Order of the Red Eagle.
 :  2nd Class of the Order of the Rising Sun.
 2nd Class of the Order of the Double Dragon.
 member of the Order of Albert the Bear.

References

1867 births
1934 deaths
Ursel
Knights Grand Cross of the Order of St Gregory the Great
Ambassadors of Belgium to the Holy See
Belgian diplomats
Grand Crosses of the Order of Christ (Portugal)